Marksville may refer to:

Marksville, Louisiana, a city in the United States
Marksville, Virginia
Marksville culture, an archaeological culture in the United States